"Vento sulla luna" is a song by Italian singer Annalisa with featuring vocals by Rkomi. It was written by Annalisa, Rkomi, Franco126 and Dardust, and produced by Dardust.

It was released by Warner Music Italy on 29 November 2019 as the first single from her seventh studio album Nuda. The song peaked at number 74 on the FIMI Singles Chart.

Music video
A music video to accompany the release of "Vento sulla luna" was then released onto YouTube on 3 December 2019. The video was directed by Enea Colombi and shot in the Monte Amiata Housing in Milan.

Track listing

Charts

References

2019 singles
2019 songs
Annalisa songs
Songs written by Annalisa
Songs written by Dario Faini